Grzegorz Krzysztof Skwierczyński (born 25 July 1974 in Siedlce) is a Polish politician. He was elected to the Sejm on 25 September 2005, getting 6,963 votes in 18 Siedlce district as a candidate from the Samoobrona Rzeczpospolitej Polskiej list.

See also
Members of Polish Sejm 2005–2007
Skwierczyński
 Ślepowron coat of arms

External links
Grzegorz Skwierczyński – parliamentary page – includes declarations of interest, voting record, and transcripts of speeches.

1974 births
Living people
People from Siedlce
Members of the Polish Sejm 2005–2007
Self-Defence of the Republic of Poland politicians